The 1986 Mexican Grand Prix was a Formula One motor race held at Mexico City on October 12, 1986.

The first Mexican Grand Prix since 1970 was held at the newly renamed Autódromo Hermanos Rodríguez, located in the Magdalena Mixhuca recreational sports park in the middle of Mexico City. The track had been slightly shortened and modified from its previous layout; although Mexico City was located on a geologically active surface; so the circuit was very bumpy- and the most fearsome and spectacular corner on the circuit, the banked 275 km/h, 180-degree Peraltada turn remained from before, but with more run-off area and less banking than before.

It was the first win for Gerhard Berger and the first win for the Benetton team. Benetton ran on Pirelli tyres, and their relative durability compared to competitors on Goodyear tyres played to the team's advantage. Berger won this race due to not having to make a pit stop for a fresh set of tyres. It would also prove to be the final win for the turbocharged BMW engine.

Classification

Qualifying

Race

Championship standings after the race
Bold text indicates the World Champions.

Drivers' Championship standings

Constructors' Championship standings

 Note: Only the top five positions are included for both sets of  standings.

References

External links
 Grand Prix Archives Video
 Formula 1 1986 Mexican Grand Prix Video

Mexican Grand Prix
Grand Prix
Mexican Grand Prix
October 1986 sports events in Mexico